Adar, Inc. is an Information Technology (IT) company headquartered in Chicago, United States. The company provides streaming IT and IT-as-a-service to small and medium-sized enterprises (SMEs). Adar, Inc. is known for its comprehensive cloud IT brand of platform, Nerdio. It currently offers two products-Nerdio Private Cloud and Nerdio for Azure.

History

Adar, Inc. is a parent company that was founded in 2005 by Vadim Vladimirskiy, Stuart Gabel and Niall Keegan to provide online backup systems to SMEs. Soon after it was founded, the company transitioned into managing virtual infrastructure.

In 2007, it introduced Adar Private Cloud.

In January 2014, the company secured $2.4 million in Series A funding from MK Capital, which allowed it to expand and improve its products and services.

Adar Private Cloud was nominated for the CityLIGHTS Rising Star Award in July 2015. One year later, the company rebranded and launched Nerdio Private Cloud.

In 2017, the company introduced Nerdio for Azure. The company's CEO, Vadim Vladimirskiy, was nominated for the CityLIGHTS Technologist of the Year Award in 2018.

In January 2020, Nerdio split from Adar, Inc. and formed its own entity. Adar, Inc was acquired by private equity.

See also
VMware
Virtual desktop
Virtual Servers
IT-as-a-service
Web desktop

References

External links
Nerdio Official Site
ELV & ICT Solutions

Companies based in Chicago
Companies established in 2005
Information technology companies of the United States